Kenyeres is a Hungarian surname. Notable people with the surname include:

Ábel Kenyeres (born 1994), Hungarian cyclist
Fanni Kenyeres (born 1978), Hungarian handball player
József Kenyeres (born 1955), Hungarian handball player

See also
Tamás Sáringer-Kenyeres (born 1961), Hungarian agronomist and politician

Hungarian-language surnames